Sir Adam Roberts  (born 29 August 1940) is Emeritus Professor of International Relations at the University of Oxford, a senior research fellow in Oxford University's Department of Politics and International Relations, and an emeritus fellow of Balliol College, Oxford.

Background
Roberts was born in Penrith, Cumbria, the son of the poet and teacher Michael Roberts and the writer and editor Janet Adam Smith. He went to Westminster School, London, 1953–8. He studied Modern History at the University of Oxford (Magdalen College), 1959–62, winning the Stanhope essay prize, 1961.

Career
Assistant Editor, Peace News, London, 1962–5. Noel Buxton Student in International Relations, London School of Economics and Political Science (LSE), 1965–8. Lecturer in International Relations at the London School of Economics and Political Science, 1968–81. Alastair Buchan Reader in International Relations at University of Oxford, 1981–6. Montague Burton Professor of International Relations at Oxford University, 1986–2007.

With interests in civil resistance, international law, the United Nations, strategic studies, and the history (and theories) of international relations, his publications include works on the United Nations and on Hugo Grotius jointly edited with Professor Benedict Kingsbury. Roberts was elected a Fellow of the British Academy (the UK's national academy for the humanities and social sciences) in 1990, serving as its President (2009–13). He served on the Council of the International Institute for Strategic Studies (2002–08); on the Council for Science and Technology (2010–13); and on the United Kingdom Defence Academy Advisory Board (2003–15).

In 2002, he was appointed Knight Commander of the Order of St Michael and St George for services to the study and practice of international relations. He is an Honorary Fellow of the London School of Economics & Political Science, of St Antony's College, Oxford, and of Cumbria University. He has a Guest Professorship at Nankai University, Tianjin, China (2012); and is Honorary Professor, Centre for the Study of Terrorism and Political Violence at St Andrew's University (2013- ). He has been awarded honorary doctorates by King's College London (2010); Aberdeen University (2012); Aoyama Gakuin University, Tokyo (2012), and Bath University (2014). He was elected a Foreign Honorary Member, American Academy of Arts and Sciences, in 2011; and a Member, American Philosophical Society, 2013. His interests include mountaineering and cycling.

He has published articles in numerous journals, including American Journal of International Law, British Yearbook of International Law, International Affairs, International Security, Review of International Studies, Survival and The Times Literary Supplement. His publications include:

Recent articles and book chapters
  'Pandemics and Politics', Survival, London, vol. 62, no. 5, October–November 2020, pp. 7–40.
  'Foundational Myths in the Laws of War: The 1863 Lieber Code, and the 1864 Geneva Convention', Melbourne Journal of International Law, vol. 20, no. 1, July 2019, pp. 158–96. ISSN 1444-8602.
  'The Use of Force: A System of Selective Security', in Sebastian von Einsiedel, David M. Malone and Bruno Stagno Ugarte (eds.), The UN Security Council in the 21st Century, Lynne Rienner, Boulder, Colorado, 2016, pp. 349–71.  (hardback); 978-1-62637-259-7 (paperback).
  'Terrorism Research: Past, Present and Future', Studies in Conflict & Terrorism, vol. 38, no. 1, January 2015, pp. 62–74. Print edition . Online .
 'The Long Peace Getting Longer', Survival, London, vol. 54, no. 1, February–March 2012, pp. 175–83. Print edition . Online . (Review essay on Steven Pinker, The Better Angels of our Nature.)
 'Simon Frederick Peter Halliday, 1946–2010', Proceedings of the British Academy, vol. 172: Biographical Memoirs of Fellows no. X, Oxford University Press, Oxford, 2011, pp. 143–69. . .
 'The Civilian in Modern War', in Hew Strachan and Sibylle Scheipers (eds.), The Changing Character of War, Oxford University Press, Oxford, 2011, pp. 357–80.  (hardback).
 'The Civilian in Modern War', Yearbook of International Humanitarian Law, vol. 12, 2009, T.M.C. Asser Press, The Hague, 2010, pp. 13–51. ; .
 'Lives and Statistics: Are 90% of War Victims Civilians?’, Survival, London, vol. 52, no. 3, June–July 2010, pp. 115–35. Print edition . Online .
 'Detainees: Misfits in Peace and War', in Sibylle Scheipers (ed.), Prisoners in War, Oxford University Press, Oxford, 2010, pp. 263–80. .
 'An "Incredibly Swift Transition": Reflections on the End of the Cold War', in Melvyn P. Leffler and Odd Arne Westad (eds.), The Cambridge History of the Cold War, vol. III, Endings, Cambridge University Press, Cambridge, 2010, pp. 513–34. .
 'The Equal Application of the Laws of War: A Principle under Pressure', International Review of the Red Cross, Cambridge, vol. 90, no. 872, December 2008, pp. 931–62. .
 'Doctrine and Reality in Afghanistan', Survival, London, vol. 51, no. 1, February–March 2009, pp. 29–60. Print edition . Online .
 'Torture and Incompetence in the "War on Terror"’, Survival, London, vol. 49, no. 1, Spring 2007. (Review article.) Print edition . Online .
 'Transformative Military Occupation: Applying the Laws of War and Human Rights', American Journal of International Law, Washington DC, vol. 100, no. 3, July 2006. .
 'The Laws of War in the War on Terror', in Fred L. Borch and Paul S. Wilson (eds.), International Law and the War on Terror (US Naval War College, International Law Studies, vol. 79), Naval War College, Newport, Rhode Island, 2003.

Books
(with Michael J. Willis, Rory McCarthy and Timothy Garton Ash) (eds.). Civil Resistance in the Arab Spring: Triumphs and Disasters, Oxford University Press, Oxford, January 2016. . US edition. Article arising from the book in  The Guardian, London, 15 January 2016.  Discussion of the book with Professor Rashid Khalidi at the Carnegie Council for Ethics in International Affairs, New York, 10 February 2016, on Ustream.TV.
  (hardback). On Google.
(with Benedict Kingsbury) (eds.) 全球治理：分列世界中的联合国 (Global Governance: United Nations in a Divided World), trans. Zhicheng Wu and colleagues at Nankai University, Central Compilation & Translation Press, Beijing, 2010. . (A specially adapted version of United Nations, Divided World: The UN's Roles in International Relations, Oxford University Press, 2nd edition, 1993, and incorporating a new introduction by the editors, revised/new appendices, and Foreword by Professor Wang Jisi of Peking University.)
  (hardback);  (paperback, 2011, with new Foreword on the Arab Spring). US edition. On Google.
  (hardback);  (paperback). US edition. On Google.
  (hardback);  (paperback). US edition.
   (paperback). US edition.
Civil Resistance in the East European and Soviet Revolutions, Cambridge, Mass.: Albert Einstein Institution, 1991. . Available at.
  (hardback);  (paperback).  US edition. Oxford Scholarship Online. On Google.
 .
 (hardback);  (paperback). On Google.
  (paperback).
  (Also published as Civilian Resistance as a National Defense, Stackpole Books, Harrisburg, US, 1968; and, with a new Introduction on 'Czechoslovakia and Civilian Defence', as Civilian Resistance as a National Defence, Penguin Books, Harmondsworth, UK, and Baltimore, US, 1969. .)

See also 
 Civilian-based Defense

Lectures
 The Equal Application of the Laws of War: A Principle Under Pressure in the Lecture Series of the United Nations Audiovisual Library of International Law
 Reinventing the Wheel: The cost of neglecting international history the 2010 Gresham Special Lecture delivered in the Guildhall, City of London.

References

External links
Oxford University Department of Politics & International Relations: http://www.politics.ox.ac.uk/associates/adam-roberts.html. 
Oxford University Programme on Civil Resistance and Power Politics: https://www.politics.ox.ac.uk/research-projects/civil-resistance-and-power-politics-domestic-and-international-dimensions.html

1940 births
Living people
Nonviolence advocates
Fellows of Balliol College, Oxford
Knights Commander of the Order of St Michael and St George
Fellows of the British Academy
Presidents of the British Academy
People from Penrith, Cumbria
Montague Burton Professors of International Relations (University of Oxford)
Alumni of Magdalen College, Oxford
Honorary Fellows of the London School of Economics
Members of the American Philosophical Society